Paris's former Chemin de fer de Petite Ceinture ('small(er) belt railway'), also colloquially known as La Petite Ceinture, was a circular railway built as a means to supply the city's fortification walls, and as a means of transporting merchandise and passengers between Paris' major rail-company stations. Beginning as two distinct 'Ceinture Syndicate' freight and 'Paris-Auteuil' passenger lines from 1851, these lines formed an arc that surrounded the northern two thirds of Paris, an arc that would become a full circle of rail around the capital when its third Ceinture Rive Gauche section was built in 1867. 

Although the Syndicate-owned portion of the line was freight-only in its first years, after the creation of a passenger service from 1862, the Chemin de fer de Ceinture became Paris's first metro-like urban transport, and even more so after the 'Ceinture Rive Gauche' passenger-and-freight section began. The line's passenger service was a popular means of public transport until its 1900 Universal Exposition peak-traffic year.  

Paris's first Metro line opened that year: from then, the numbers of those using the Petite Ceinture passenger service dropped steadily until its closure in 1934. Although maintained as a freight line, even this use of the Petite Ceinture had come to a practical standstill by the 1980s.  

Since then, sections of the Petite Ceinture's trenches and infrastructure have been recuperated and renovated for the inter-urban RER C passenger transport service, some of its former stations have been sold to local commerce and services. The future of the remaining stretches of Petite Ceinture has always been, and still is, the source of much debate.

Origins
France's first steam-locomotive-driven passenger rail service was its 1837 Paris-Saint-Germain railway that ran to an 'embarcadère' ancestor of today's Gare Saint-Lazare. In the years following, new railways appeared in many regions across the country, but in all, its early 19th-century rail technology expansion was far behind that of its western European rivals. The Louis-Philippe government-monarchy planned to close this gap with their 1842 "Legrand Star", a map of pre-programmed railway concessions that made Paris the centre of a spiderweb network of lines reaching to all regions and borders of France. By the end of the decade, France's rail was ruled by five distinct railway companies, each with their own exclusive monopoly over their respective regions of France.

Paris before the Petite Ceinture

Paris was only half its present size in the years of the Ceinture's creation: its limits then were the city's 1784 Fermiers-Généraux tax wall that followed almost exactly today's Métro lines 6 and 2). From 1841, Paris dotted itself with a ring of defences a few kilometres outside these: completed in 1845, the Thiers wall fortifications enclosed land that was mostly countryside, save for a few 'faubourgs' extending for a distance along the roadways from its city gates.

In that year, Paris had five major rail stations, all located just inside the city tax walls, each run by separate companies: Paris-Rouen (later Ouest, near today's gare Saint-Lazare, Nord (at today's gare du Nord), Paris-Strasbourg (later Est, at today's gare de l'Est), Paris-Lyon (at today's gare de Lyon) and Paris-Orléans (at today's gare d'Austerlitz). Since the rail barons of the time were persuaded that direct connection to a competing line would endanger their control over their respective region monopolies, there was no company inter-station service of any kind: freight and passengers travelling between regions of France had no choice but to commute from station to station by road through the congested capital.

A Military idea
The idea for Paris's Chemin de Fer de Petite Ceinture originated with its fortifications: rail transport was still relatively new when Paris's city fortifications were completed in 1845, and France's Generals saw the new technology as a means to quickly move troops, machinery, ammunition and provisions between points along the circular wall. An initial 1842 study resulted in three projects for railways to the inside of the fortifications, another between the forts outside them, and another ring in a still larger diameter outside the city, but by 1845 the government's increasingly urgent priority was joining the nation's railways through a Right Bank portion of the inner-fortification rails.

The government of the time was too financially burdened to undertake building and managing a railway on its own, so it depended upon France's major rail companies for financial support and management. The post-1848-revolution government was not in an any better position to negotiate and all the Second Republic government's coercive manoeuvring managed to achieve was the rail companies making freight-exchange deals and mergers amongst themselves.

One Ring, Three Lines

I - the Syndicated 'Chemin de Fer de Ceinture' (Rive Droite)
Napoleon III's coup d'État on 2 December 1851 meant a new government with more grandiose visions for France's railway future. Re-opening the negotiations based on a pre-Second Empire project to connect all of Paris's railway stations through an arc of rail between the Rouen-Versailles Rive Droite (Gare-St-Lazare) and Orléans (Gare d'Austerlitz) lines, with the Versailles Rive Gauche lines (leading to today's Gare Montparnasse) joined to its Versailles-Rive Droite counterpart through a junction at Viroflay (in the suburbs to the southwest of Paris), the Rouen, Nord, Strasbourg, Orléans (then bankrupt, but state-sponsored) and Lyon companies signed participation, and the project was transformed into a decree-proposition that the Prince-President signed into law on 10 December 1851.

In this agreement, against a 1,000,000 Franc contribution from each company, the government would organise and finance the landscaping, bridges and rails for the line, to be completed no later than two years from the concession signing. Once completed, it would be placed at the disposal of a 'Compagnie de Chemin de fer de Ceinture de Paris' (not yet Rive Droite), a syndicate comprising two members of each company, for a period of 99 years, during which they would provide a service 'for freight and passengers' using rolling stock from each company.

The first stretch of Parisian-station-connecting rail built wasn't part of the Ceinture concession at all, but one originating from an earlier inter-company deal which had become a separate concession of its own, an arc of rail between the Nord and Strasbourg (later: Est) lines: open in April 1852, it would be connected to the Ceinture upon its completion. The first length of the Ceinture railway was completed 12 December 1852 between Rouen's Batignolles freight yards and the Pont du Nord, a point above the Nord company rails south to their station in Paris. The second Ceinture section delivered, between Pont du Nord and Aubervilliers (the point where the Nord-Strasbourg arc-connection joined with the Ceinture railway), opened to service on 30 September 1853.
From then, trains could travel freely between the Batignolles (Rouen), La Chapelle (Nord) and La Villette (Strasbourg-Est) freight yards. The construction of the line between the Pont du Nord and Ivry (the Rive Gauche Orléans company freight yard), as it undercut the hills of Montmartre and Belleville, was more problematic: several landslides delayed the work there, but it was delivered in one track from December 1853, freight service began from 25 March, and was fully functional after its second rail was delivered in May 1854.

II - the Ouest Company's Paris – Auteuil passenger line

The Pereire-owned Ouest company requested and obtained the government railway concession that 'extended the ceinture railway through Batignolles and Auteuil' in 1852. This line was planned as a passenger-only service created mainly for the Parisian bourgeoisie destined for their country homes to the south-west of the city, and had nothing at all to do with the freight-only Ceinture line, but the government indicated in the concession agreement that the line was to be "an extension of the Chemin de fer de Ceinture". Leaving the Gare Saint-Lazare rails just to the north of the station, the 'Paris-Auteuil' line arced west, passed through the town of Batignolles, then arced south with several stops before its terminus in the town of Auteuil.

In an effort to avoid blocking traffic (like the Ceinture Rive Droite did), it was built below ground level for most of its 9.5 km length, an endeavour that required the construction of 14 bridges across its entrenched path. Besides its rue St-Lazare embarcadère terminus (also serving the Ouest company's other lines), the line had five stations: Pont-Cardinet (an SNCF station today), Courcelles (today's Pereire - Levallois RER C station), Neuilly-Porte Maillot, Avenue de l'Impératrice (Avenue Foch), Passy (Avenue Henri-Martin) and Auteuil (unused today). The Paris-Auteuil passenger line was inaugurated on 2 May 1854.

III - the Ouest Company's 'Chemin de Fer de Ceinture Rive Gauche'

From 1852 the state had continued, non-officially, their own plan-study for the Left Bank arc of rail that would complete their original fortification-provision goals, and from 1857 this became an official pre-project that Napoleon III declared 'of public interest' in 1861. As all of the Ceinture Syndicate company lines were already connected between them, they saw no commercial interest in this. The state, intent in their aims, had begun procuring the funds necessary to purchase the lands and lay rail for the line even before Napoleon III's declaration, and had from 1863 begun the landscaping and bridge work needed for a Chemin de fer de Ceinture Rive Gauche: bridges because, unlike the Rive Droite Ceinture line, the Rive Gauche wouldn't block traffic, but pass over and under streets over bridges, below underpasses and through tunnels.

It is worth mentioning that, during the above, Paris had doubled in size: from 1860, Paris annexed all the 'country communes' between its city tax walls and the fortifications, which put the formerly countryside Ceinture line within the new City limits. Providing a passenger service for these 'new arrondissements' became yet another State goal, as was the need for railway transport to the upcoming 1867 International Exposition that would bring crowds of visitors to the Left Bank Champ de Mars.

In earlier state-rail-company negotiations, the state had obtained the possibility of buying the Auteuil line back from the Ouest company, and they used this as leverage to get the company to agree to signing a Ceinture Rive Gauche concession convention on 31 May 1865. In this agreement, the state would return the Auteuil-line concession to the Ouest company, would complete the already-underway landscaping and bridges needed for the line, as well work an 'eventual' additional concession for a rail connection between their Auteuil line and the Ceinture Rive Droite at Batignolles; the state reserved, all the same, an eight-year delay during which it reserved the right to purchase some or all of the concession in case ongoing plans for a 'métropolitan' railway line went through. The Ouest company, on their side of the agreement, would lay the rail, provide all the buildings, and execute and maintain rail service; for the Exposition, the Ouest agreed to lay a 'temporary' antenna from its 'Grenelle' station north to the Champ de Mars, and make the required modifications to their Auteuil line that would allow it to be used by freight trains.

The Ceinture Rive Gauche line began service on 25 February 1867, and the 'temporary' Grenelle-Champ de Mars portion of track entered service two days later, all in time for the Exposition opening. All that remained was the portion of rail connecting the Auteuil lines to the Ceinture Rive Droite under the railway lines from the (rebuilt and renamed since 1853) Gare St-Lazare: the underpass construction began in February 1867, and it and its new station, Courcelles-Ceinture, began service from 25 March 1869.

Ceinture Service

The early years 
In November 1856, four Est-company locomotives (and one in reserve) were enough to provide freight service between the city's rail company freight yards, and trains were composed of company-owned freight cars. Most often, freight, travelling the Ceinture in the wagons belonging to the company that brought it to the capital, once arriving at the freight-yard of the company taking it elsewhere in France, was transferred to that company's wagons, an onerous process. The Ceinture service was at first reserved for only 'main station' companies, but from 1 September 1855 opened to local merchants receiving goods, and two freight stations, 'Ceinture de Charonne' and 'La Petite Villette', opened in 1855 and 1856, respectively. Service at first was only during daytime hours, but from 1857, after a telegraph service was installed, ran at night as well. From 1861, the North company took over providing locomotion with seven new 040 T (numbered 551-557), engines that would become the signature Ceinture locomotive.

The Ceinture Rive Droite concession agreement stipulated that the railway should have a passenger service, but the companies were content with their freight-only line. After increasingly hostile state pressure, the companies opened five hastily-built passenger stations in 1862: 'Batignolles-Clichy', 'Belleville-Villette' (near the "La Petite Villette" freight station), 'Ménilmontant', and 'Charonne' (in the existing Charonne freight yard), and 'La Rapée-Bercy'. Two others, 'La Chapelle-Saint-Denis' and 'Bel Air', opened before two years later; the latter would be the line's first 'correspondence' point from 1863 when the Est-owned 'Paris-Vincennes' line (to its place de la Bastille terminus) added a 'Bel-Air-Paris' station just below the Syndicate 'Bel-Air-Ceinture' station. The Ceinture-Syndicate-owned passenger cars were two-level 'Impériales' pulled by two 030 'Mammouth' locomotives, and service was one train in each direction every two hours. Extra trains were added on holidays, and from 1866, to serve local factories, reduced-price morning and evening 'worker trains' as well.

Meanwhile, the Ouest company's passenger-only Paris-Auteuil line had been running trains every half hour in the mornings, and every twenty minutes in the afternoon, between its Saint-Lazare terminus, 'Batignolles-Clichy', 'Courcelles-Levallois', Neuilly-Porte Maillot', 'Avenue de l'Impératrice' (later 'avenue Foch'), 'Passy' and 'Auteuil' (terminus) stations since its 1854 opening. From 1866, in preparation for its connection to the Ceinture Rive Gauche, its quays were lowered, and a new Auteuil terminal, lateral to the first, took trains from the Saint-Lazare station, creating a correspondence with the old platforms that were from then dedicated to Ceinture Rive Gauche service.  

The also-Ouest-owned Ceinture Rive Gauche's stations were: From the Auteuil terminus, the 'Point du Jour' station at the end of a new bridge-viaduct across the river Seine, 'Grenelle' (where passengers could transfer to a shuttle to the Champ de Mars), Ouest-Ceinture (a transfer point with the Ouest lines to their 'Paris-Versailles Rive Gauche' station), 'Montrouge', 'Gentilly' (correspondence with the 'Paris-Sceaux' line to its Denfert-Rochereau terminus), 'Maison Blanche', and 'Orléans-Ceinture' (correspondence with the Orléans line to today's Gare d'Austerlitz). From its 1866 opening to passenger-only service, the entire line ran alternating Ceinture Syndicate and Ouest trains between the Ceinture line's then 'Avenue de Clichy' (formerly 'Batignolles-Clichy') and 'Auteuil' terminus at a rate of one train an hour in each direction, and at a rate of one every half-hour on Sundays and holidays. The entire 33-kilometer trip, with its 21 stops, took, at best, 1h50 then.

While planning to replace Paris several intra muros slaughterhouses with a single complex near La Villette in 1859, Napoleon III demanded that the new slaughterhouse be connected to the Ceinture by rail, a plan that became a concession and decree on 19 October 1864. It was a stretch of rail that, after leaving the Ceinture to either side of the Belleville-Villette station to form a triangle to its east, arced northward to two stations, 'Paris Bestiaux' in the slaughterhouse marketplace and, further on to the other side of the drawbridged canal, 'Paris Abattoirs' in the slaughterhouse complex itself. The antenna and stations were open to service from 18 October 1867, three days before the inauguration of the slaughterhouses themselves.

The completion of the Courcelles underpass and its 'Courcelles-Ceinture' station for the 1867 Universal Exposition meant that trains could travel in a full circle around Paris, but passengers still had to change trains: although the Ceinture Rive Droite's terminus moved to 'Courcelles-Ceinture', passengers still had to change trains over walkways to the 'Courcelles-Levallois' station. Also for the Universal Exposition, the Ceinture Rive Droite dotted its line with two new temporary 'for-exposition correspondence' stations, 'Est-Ceinture' (where the ceinture crossed the lines to the gare de l'Est) and 'Bercy-Ceinture' over the gare de Lyon lines (that was dismantled after the exposition end) stations appeared, and four new permanent stations: 'Saint-Ouen', 'Boulevard Ornano', 'Pont de Flandre', and 'Avenue de Vincennes'. Replacing the Nord company engines, the Ceinture Syndicate bought and ran its own 040 T locomotives from 1869, which were stored and maintained in new hangars near the Chapelle-Saint-Denis freight yards.

Growing pains 
The Chemin de Fer de Ceinture served its military purpose when it was requisitioned by the state for the 1870 Prussian war and siege of Paris. The Ceinture Rive Droite was only slightly damaged from Prussian bombardments from the north, but the Auteuil and Ceinture Rive Gauche lines were heavily damaged in the 1870-71 Commune civil war that followed: the 'Neuilly-Porte Maillot' station was completely destroyed, the Auteuil terminus mostly destroyed, and the Auteuil viaduct and 'Grenelle' station were heavily damaged. After the conflict's end, at first only in sections with trains every hour, Ceinture service returned to its half-hour cadence, begun just before the war, from 16 July 1871.

The Chemin de fer de Ceinture Rive Gauche was still a passenger only line, but from 1874 a junction between the Ouest lines near the Ceinture 'Vaugirard' station allowed freight trains a shortcut from the bifurcation at Viroflay. The Ouest company had opened a 'Reuilly' freight station off of its Paris-Vincennes line in 1877, and the Ceinture Rive Gauche 'Bel-Air' junction opened to freight service two years later. The Ceinture Rive Gauche's first dedicated-freight station, 'Grenelle-Marchandises', also opened in 1879. 

The Chemin de Fer de Ceinture's passenger traffic was on the rise, and it was expected to be higher for the upcoming 1878 Universal Exposition. The Nord and Paris-Lyon-Méditerranée lines still had no passenger correspondence points with the Ceinture, but this changed with the 1875 opening of the Nord-line  'Nord Ceinture' station near the Ceinture's 'La Chapelle-Saint-Denis' station, and the Paris-Lyon-Méditerranée's 'Bercy-Ceinture' station on their lines near the Ceinture 'La Rapée-Bercy' station, and Est-Ceinture re-opened from 15 May 1878. The Paris-Vincennes line added a second arc of rail to the first one at Bel-Air that allowed trains to travel to and from Bastille in both directions from 1878, and the Ouest company rebuilt a new antenna to the Champ de Mars (replacing the one dismantled in 1869), but this time permanently as the head of a still-unauthorised 'Paris-Moulineaux' suburban railway line that was to have its terminus at the Pont de l'Alma. The Paris-Auteuil line also built a new station for the exposition, 'Avenue du Trocadéro'. With the temporary addition of the Est company's Paris-Vincennes trains to the Ceinture schedule, its train cadence for the duration of the Exposition rose to one every fifteen minutes, and passengers to the Champ de Mars passed 50,000 per day.

The Ceinture Syndicate, pleased with its Exposition-passenger service results, after a period of experimentation after the Est company withdrew its trains at the Exposition's end, decided to make the fifteen-minute passenger service permanent from 1881, and from the following year, the Paris-Auteuil section topped its service as well; in all, the Ceinture had a passenger-service frequency of 4-8 trains an hour in each direction, but this cadence required a total suppression of freight traffic at certain times at certain points along the Ceinture Rive Droite line. The Ceinture Rive Gauche's freight service was still insufficient for local commerce, though, and this led to the opening of a new 'Glacière-Gentilly' freight yard from 1882.

Line congestion was already a problem then, and a plan to build a 'Chemin de fer de Grande Ceinture' extra-muros railway ring had already been underway since 1875. The company least concerned with freight matters, the Ouest, had abstained from the agreement, but in 1880 proposed merging the two Ceinture syndicates (Petite and Grande): this would allow the companies to transfer their freight traffic to the outer ring and dedicate the inner ring to passenger and Parisian-commerce-destined freight traffic. In exchange for its participation, the Ouest offered its Ceinture Rive Gauche and Courcelles bifurcation concessions, but demanded that its Paris-Auteuil line be exempt from it: this agreement was approved by decree on 11 November 1881, and effective from April 1883.

Although it was isolated in the suburban countryside in the year of its inauguration, the now-named 'Petite Ceinture' that year was an integral part of the city. Although the Paris-Auteuil and Ceinture Rive Droite section plans had accounted for this eventuality, the Ceinture Rive Droite had many countryside-style road-crossings, a hindrance that became more important as Paris's population grew. The Syndicate's shifting its freight transport to the Grande Ceinture made remedying this problem possible, and from 1886, with service reduced to one rail in many places, City engineers and Ceinture Syndicate workers built bridges, dug trenches, re-landscaped, and rebuilt stations, all in time for the 1889 universal exposition.

The Ouest's Ceinture Rive Gauche northwards antenna would serve the Exposition once again, but this time as the head of their 'ligne des Moulineaux' railway line that, finally built between 1886 and 1889, crossed the Ceinture on its way into Paris towards its Champ de Mars terminus. Also for the 1889 exposition, the Ceinture eliminated the train-change required between Courcelles-Ceinture and Courcelles-Levallois: from then, Ceinture trains could travel a full circle around Paris, and Ceinture trains no longer went to the Gare Saint-Lazare, serviced through a transfer to or from a Paris-Auteuil train at Courcelles-Levallois. To accommodate this change, the Ceinture Syndicate modified their ticketing, signage and colour-coding to more easily differentiate trains and their destinations.

La Belle Époque

The Petite Ceinture had become a popular mode of transport towards the end of the 19th century. The number of Ceinture passengers was near 5 million passengers a year in 1880, but rose sharply from then at 13 million in 1883 peaking at between 18 and 19 million for the 1889 Universal Exposition that was accredited with a 'boost' of around 4 million visitors during its May–November eight-month duration. A train every fifteen minutes in both directions was the absolute minimum cadence, and, after the exposition's end, the service to the gare St-Lazare was re-established, with two of those trains travelling between St-Lazare and Courcelles-Ceinture, and the other two travelling in a full Courcelles-Ceinture/Courcelles-Ceinture circle, a 1h30 trip.`

The Syndicate Ceinture passenger cars then were largely unheated, oil-lit 'impèriale ouverte' (bilevel cars with an open top deck) cars, but from 1884 they had ordered 16 new 'impèriale fermée' (covered bilevel cars) gas-lit cars, and heated all wagons from winter of 1891. That year, the Ceinture Syndicate park was 24 single-level first-class cars, 77 second-class cars, 1 class-mixed car (impèriale fermée), and 51 wagons used for baggage and freight. The open-second-level cars had been the cause of a few under-tunnel-and-bridge deaths and a few suicides over the years, and, under pressure from the state, began to replace them progressively with new single-level cars, profiting also from the occasion to replace Ouest material (that they were still using since the Ceinture Syndicate merger) with cars owned by the Syndicate itself. By 1897, there were only a few open-top-deck cars in circulation.

Correspondence with transport to the city centre improved as well, with, from 1893, a twin junction to the Nord lines and additional quays to the Chapelle-Saint-Denis station that not only allowed passengers a shorter transfer time, but eased the passing of between-main-station trains that had to use the off-Ceinture La Chapelle freight-yard junction until then. From its completion, the Nord company, in exchange for giving 40% of profits made to the Ceinture Syndicate, added its trains to the Ceinture schedule with a new full-circle Nord-Station-Nord-Station service. Already decreed 'of public interest' since 1889, new 'rue d'Avron' station opened by the street of the same name in 1895, lightening the load of the nearby Avenue de Vincennes station. The new station would be used, from 1896, to experiment with raising the platform from its track level to a height that would ease passenger access to the trains: deemed a success, and extended to all Ceinture Syndicate stations, it condemned many of the line's older step-access cars to disuse.

The Ouest company, in light of the upcoming 1900 Universal Exposition, was granted a concession on 6 July 1896 to extend its Moulineaux line from its Champ de Mars terminus to a new 'Invalides' station; the Ouest not only extended its line, but lowered its river-hugging length into a trench to eliminate its railway crossings at every bridge and added four new, minuscule, Chinese-pagoda-esque stations: travelling from the Ceinture inwards, one passed 'pont Mirabeau' (later 'Javel'), 'pont de Grenelle', 'de la Bourdonnais' and 'pont de l’Alma' before reaching the 'Invalides' terminus. Not concerning the Ceinture directly, but attached to this extension, was another Ouest project approved on 14 June 1897: the 'Boulanvilliers' line extension that, crossing the river on a 'viaduc de Passy' just below the pont de l'Alma, would allow Ceinture and St-Lazare passengers a much shorter trip between the city centre and the Champ de Mars. It was an extensive project: the Paris-Auteuil ravine between Courcelles-Levallois and Passy was widened into a straight-walled trench wide enough to accommodate two additional sets of rails to either side of the existing line: below the 'Avenue Henri Martin' station, the new lines entered curving tunnels to pass below the Paris-Auteuil lines to emerge at a new entrenched 'Boulanvilliers' station before, after passing through another tunnel, emerging on the river-crossing viaduct that curved left to meet the path of the Moulineaux line rails towards the Champ de Mars and Invalides terminus.

Several other improvements as the 1900 Universal Exposition approached: a temporary 'Claude Decaen' stop (that would become permanent from 1906) to serve Exposition installations in the Parc de Vincennes, new Ceinture Syndicate cars and engines (more Nord-built 030Ts), electric lighting for all 186 cars, and the Champ de Mars station was modified with, in addition to its platforms serving for trains continuing to Invalides, twenty platforms as a terminus for trains from all destinations. The schedule was modified as well to accommodate the many shorter-distance 'navette' trains travelling to and from the exposition: in all, the Champ de Mars station transported 3,979,429 passengers, and the total Ceinture passengers for 1900, all companies confounded, was 38,985,079 passengers, its absolute peak.

Decline
Construction of what would become the Paris Métro had been underway since 1898: the Ceinture had created a junction in 1899 with the 'Est/Ouest' metro line company ateliers near the porte de Vincennes, and used it to deliver rolling stock to Paris's first metro line, the 'Porte Maillot–Porte de Vincennes' line that was inaugurated on 19 July 1900. The Ceinture Syndicate was already preparing to meet future competition through lowering passenger ticket prices and increasing the tempo of their trains during rush-hour periods. The Ouest company, perhaps already predicting the inevitable, withdrew its engines and cars from Ceinture circulation after its 'Boulainvilliers' service began from 1901; the Ceinture Syndicate replaced these with material of its own and adjusted its train schedules to fill in the slack: fifteen new passenger-train engines, Nord 230Ts, arriving between 1902 and 1903, reduced the time it took for a full-circle trip by ten minutes.

Contrary to these measures, the Ceinture Syndicate reversed its stance on freight traffic, and returned to its pre-Exposition Petite Ceinture freight itineraries in 1902. One year later, they compensated the Ceinture Rive Gauche's freight insufficiency with the opening of a new freight-yard that had been in the works since 1879, 'Paris-Gobelins', in 1903. Just to the west of there the same year, the Ceinture opened a 'Paris-Brancion' livestock station below the still-expanding 'Vaugirard' slaughterhouses, and the Charonne-Marchandises freight-station expanded in 1904.

The number of passengers had already begun to drop by then, with a 4.55% drop between 1902 and 1903. The Ceinture reduced its minimum train cadence from six an hour in each direction to four from 1 April that year, and the North company stopped its Nord-Nord circular service between 1907 and 1908, replacing its access to the Nord main station through a 'shuttle' service between it and La Chapelle-Saint-Denis). The Ceinture syndicate, most likely because of its 1907-1908 loss of 3 million passengers (from 28 million), refused to fill the void, and instead reorganised its then Ceinture-Syndicate-only Courcelles-Ceinture/Courcelles-Ceinture passenger service to two trains an hour in evenings, three an hour in 'daytime' periods, and six an hour during rush-hour periods.

Freight, on the other hand, was even increasing: Between 1905 and 1911, it added new Ceinture-access junctions to its Aubervilliers freight yard (to the Nord-Est junction and to the Ceinture line by its Pont de Flandre station), added direct-access junctions to the northern and southern junctions of the Belleville-Villette freight yard, and expanded its Gobelins freight yard. From 1909, the Ceinture had 13 new Nord 3.800-type engines (numbered 81 to 93), and three new 0-8-0T engines (numbered 14 to 16); the latter would be the last steam engines ever ordered by the Ceinture Syndicate.

After a slight increase because of the Metro's immobilisation because of the 1910 floods, the Ceinture passenger traffic continued its decline, with 17 million passengers for 1911. The Ceinture syndicate reduced train frequency again that year, with only four trains an hour in each direction at peak hours, and two trains an hour for the rest of the day. The onset of World War I slowed the passenger exodus somewhat, but because of a lack of workers and the price of combustibles then, the Ceinture Syndicate stopped its service to the Paris-Auteuil from December 1915, from when the Ceinture's terminuses became Auteuil and Courcelles-Ceinture.

The Auteuil line's 1854 'Batignolles' station was destroyed during the renovation and enlargement of the Batignolles tunnels to the Gare St. Lazare from 1911, and the temporary station that replaced it took the name 'Pont Cardinet' from 1919; that same station would become the line's terminus in 1922 when, after a rail-traffic interrupting collapse of those same tunnels in 1921, it was moved there when the station's definite construction was complete. From then the only connection to the Gare St-Lazare from the ceinture was through the Boulainvilliers antenna (electrified since 1919), but this service, little used by passengers, ended from 1924. The Auteuil line was joined to the Ceinture only through its Auteuil terminus from then; the two lines would become further distinct when the Auteuil line, with the Boulanvilliers antenna, was electrified one year later. Meanwhile, the Syndicate Petite Ceinture's passenger traffic was losing about one million passengers every two years, and had dropped below 8 million by 1926.

When the City began demolishing its fortifications from 1919, the Ceinture saw an opportunity to relieve their over-encumbered Charonne-Marchandises freight station by expanding it yet further onto the land freed, but the City refused their request, a setback that may have been behind the Syndicate decision to return all its from-main-line freight traffic to the Grande Ceinture the same year. In another effort to ease its freight-traffic overload, the Ceinture Syndicate purchased its first and only Diesel engine in 1932: an 800-horsepower 'Sulzer' machine numbered 'D1', it would aid the composition of freight wagons before they were attached to a steam engine for Ceinture transit.

The number of passengers on the Syndicate Ceinture had dropped to 10,247,533 by 1920, and to 9,440,524 by 1922. In the same period, the Auteuil line had 9 million passengers in 1920, a drastic drop to 6 million one year later, and by 1930 had only 4,109,000 passengers.

From 4 May 1931, several letters and meetings about the situation with the Minister of Public Works resulted in a plan end passenger service for the line, and to replace it with a 'PC' bus service that would run along the Boulevards Maréchaux between Courcelles-Ceinture and Auteuil: in the final agreement signed by the Minister 28 February 1934, the Ceinture Syndicate was authorised to end its passenger service from 1 April that year.

Local freight role, dismantlement and abandon

The end of the Petitie Ceinture's passenger service was also the dissolution of the Grande-Ceinture-Petite-Ceinture Syndicate, and the concession obligations were divided between the Est, Nord and État (the state-owned entity that had since bought the Ouest company) railway companies in a decree on 23 October 1934. The future of the Paris-Auteuil passenger line, now owned by the État (state) company, had been a subject of debate since the French State (as the État company) bought the line ten years before: first proposed as an addition to the still-growing Métropolitan underground railway network, the state also imagined extending its electrified service along the former Ceinture Rive Gauche line, but in the end service continued as before with the only change being, from 1935, a tarification modification to a single-class 'Metro type' ticket and fee.

The Nord company alone ran the remaining Rive Gauche, Rive Droite, and Courcelles portions of the Petite Ceinture from 1935, which meant the closing of the Ceinture Syndicate-owned La Chapelle-Saint-Denis engine hangars. Discussions about re-opening a Petite Ceinture passenger service beginning the same year ended fruitlessly two years later, with the only change being a "Courcelles-Ceinture à Auteuil-Boulogne" renaming.

World War II left the Petite Ceinture practically unscathed: a 1943 allied bomb (aimed at the Javel and Billancourt factories) damaged an arch of the Point du Jour bridge, and the 1944 Liberation of Paris made the Ceinture the scene of many a skirmish. An agreement earlier that year granted the Ceinture rail between its Champ de Mars freight yard and the east of its Avenue de Clichy station to the 'Region Ouest' (former 'État') company-member of the SNCF formed in 1938; this length of rail would later become part of the future RER C through Paris. The Courcelles embranchement, practically unused and reduced to one track since 1934, disappeared underneath a 1950s-era building project, and the Courcelles-Ceinture - correspondence was replaced with a 'metro-like' tunnel; a later building project swallowed the path of the disaffected rail and destroyed the old 'Courcelles-Ceinture' station a few years later.

Freight traffic had actually accelerated since the Petite Ceinture passenger service ended; the Tolbiac freight yard was renovated from 1954, and from 1972, Gobelins-Marchandes became an underground station with access ramps for trucks making deliveries to local commerces.

Present state and re-use

The connection between Gare du Nord and Gare de l'Est was in use until the 2000s but has seen use fall dramatically. Passenger and freight services from both stations are hauled by engines from the SNCF depots at La Chapelle and Pantin, seldom exchanging rolling stock. The Grande Ceinture is currently used to swap stock and as a diversion line.

When plans to reanimate Paris's tramway in a ring encircling Paris began from 1995, re-using parts of the Petite Ceinture was under serious consideration. However, the planning board opted for a line along the Boulevards des Maréchaux (Boulevards of the Marshals, a ring of boulevards, formerly a road to the inside of the City's former 'Fortifications' defenses, remparts). The first of these 'Maréchaux' tram lines, Line 3, was inaugurated on 16 December 2006.

Access to the unused rail tracks was partially forbidden, but enthusiasts explored it nonetheless, describing it as a quiet, natural garden space within Paris.

In 2007, several projects were initiated to rehabilitate the old chemin de fer and transform it into an urban park. Three sections of the old railway were opened to the public, with more to come. One of the legally accessible parts is the Petite Ceinture in the 15th arrondissement in the south of Paris.

On 23 March 2019, a section in the 20th arrondissement opened to the public.

Re-use by the RER C
The Ligne d'Auteuil closed in 1985 to make way for the Réseau Express Régional (RER) C line. The RER C has been extended to Montigny-Beauchamp and Argenteuil after the construction of a new tunnel crossing north-west Paris. The line branches off at Champ de Mars, crossing the Seine. From there the line is underground; the Ligne d'Auteuil was covered in 1988, and the line between Henri Martin and Courcelles was reduced from four tracks to two. It exits Paris in a tunnel ending in Clichy.

References

Bibliography

External links

 Illustrated review of Georges Méliès' 1898 film Panorama from Top of a Moving Train (Panorama pris d’un train en marche), believed to have been filmed along the route, but actually filmed from a train of the Chemin de fer de Vincennes, which crosses the Petite ceinture at Bel-Air.
BBC article and video about the Little Belt
  Petite Ceinture Info (history, news, projects and interactive maps)

History of rail transport in France
Rail transport in Paris
Railway lines in Île-de-France
Railway lines opened in 1852
Railway lines closed in 1934
Defunct railroads
1852 establishments in France